The Coordinated Science Laboratory (CSL) is a major scientific research laboratory at the University of Illinois Urbana-Champaign. With deep roots in information technology, CSL has invented and deployed many landmark innovations, such as the electric vacuum gyroscope, the first computer-assisted instructional program and the plasma TV. Today, research thrusts include computer vision, economics and energy systems, information trust, neuroengineering, parallel computing, robotics and more.

History 
Established in 1951 as a classified defense laboratory, the Coordinated Science Laboratory (or CSL) was originally designed to be a center for research in remote sensing and space sciences, signal, image and speech processing and thin film electronics.

Faculty and funding 
Research at CSL is conducted by more than 100 faculty members spanning 11 departments in the University. The lab also employs more than 500 graduate and undergraduate students.

CSL is funded by many federal, state and private programs. It receives the majority of its operating and research budget from DARPA, the National Science Foundation, NASA, and from private corporations. Corporate funders have included  AT&T, Cisco, Hewlett-Packard, Intel, Lucent, Microsoft, NVIDIA, and Sun Microsystems.

Major centers and institutes within CSL 
 Advanced Digital Sciences Center
 Center for Exascale Simulation of Plasma-Coupled Combustion
 CompGen
 Health Care Engineering Systems Center
 Information Trust Institute
 National Center for Professional and Research Ethics
 Parallel Computing Institute
 Systems on Nanoscale Information fabriCs (SONIC)

Notable research contributions 
 Electric vacuum gyroscope (the central component of inertial navigation systems, primarily used by submarines)
 Portable radar systems
 PLATO (the first computer-based education system)
 Flat panel plasma displays
 Deuterium Method for processing microchips (extends the life of microchips by 10 to 50 times normal length)
 Quantum wire lasers
 Quantum dots

See also 

 Universal Parallel Computing Research Center-Illinois
 UIUC College of Engineering
 Beckman Institute for Advanced Science and Technology
 Carl R. Woese Institute for Genomic Biology
 National Center for Supercomputing Applications

External links 
 Coordinated Science Laboratory
 History of the Decision and Control Laboratory, a research group within CSL

University and college laboratories in the United States
University of Illinois Urbana-Champaign centers and institutes